Brian Mallinson (born 13 May 1947) is a South African cricketer. He played in one List A and three first-class matches for Border in 1971/72.

See also
 List of Border representative cricketers

References

External links
 

1947 births
Living people
South African cricketers
Border cricketers
People from Grantham